Kristoffer Zachariassen (born 27 January 1994) is a Norwegian professional footballer who plays as a midfielder for Ferencváros.

Club career
On 15 July 2021, Zachariassen signed a contract with Hungarian side Ferencváros.

International career
Zachariassen made his debut for the Norway national team on 6 June 2021 in a friendly against Greece. He started the game and was substituted at half-time with Norway down 2–0 at home. The game finished with a 2–1 loss.

Career statistics

Club

Honours
Sarpsborg 08
 Norwegian Football Cup runner-up: 2017

Ferencváros
 Nemzeti Bajnokság I: 2021–22
 Magyar Kupa: 2021-22

References

1994 births
Living people
Norwegian footballers
Association football midfielders
Norway international footballers
Eliteserien players
Nest-Sotra Fotball players
Sarpsborg 08 FF players
Rosenborg BK players
Ferencvárosi TC footballers
Norwegian expatriate footballers
Norwegian expatriate sportspeople in Hungary
Expatriate footballers in Hungary